Sculthorpe may be a reference to:

Places
Sculthorpe, Norfolk, a place in the English county of Norfolk

Surname
Paul Sculthorpe, English Rugby league
Peter Sculthorpe, the Australian composer